Dinner Time is the debut album by Boot Camp Clik member Louieville Sluggah. It was released in 2007.

Track listing
 Henny
 Fired Up
 Eat By T-Spass a.k.a. Tye
 Look Into My Eyes
 It Was Hard
 Be Eazee
 O.T.P.
 Doggie Holla
 Diesel
 O.T.P.G.
 Doggies And Doggettes
 Holla

2007 albums
Louieville Sluggah albums